Twoism is the first EP released by Boards of Canada, on their own Music70 record label in 1995. It was a self-financed cassette and record distributed privately. Major public releases would not happen until 1996's Hi Scores EP on Skam Records. This EP was, however, the work which got them noticed by Skam Records.  In 2002, the EP was reissued on vinyl and CD by Warp Records.

Content
Before Twoism was re-pressed years later, it was a highly sought-after item, being pressed in an edition of approximately 100 copies. It would often be exchanged from one person to the next for around £800 (US$1500).

There are differences between "Sixtyniner" on this EP and other releases, as Boards of Canada have often re-released early songs on later, more popular releases, sometimes with changes. On the original Music70 pressing of the record, "Sixtyniner" lasted 5:40, while reissues shortened it to 5:14.

Twoism is the only widely available Boards of Canada release with early third member Chris Horne, who was credited (as Chris H.) on the original release.  However, his name was omitted on the 2002 Warp re-released version at his own request. According to credits from Canadian Musical Reproduction Rights Agency he only co-wrote "Melissa Juice".

The channels are reversed on the CD reissue compared to the original vinyl EP. This can also be noted on the tracks "Seeya Later" and "Smokes Quantity", which have the channels reversed compared to their appearances on Hi Scores and Music Has the Right to Children respectively.

"Smokes Quantity" includes the hidden track "1986 Summer Fire" at the end. On some pressings, the two tracks are combined.

Artwork
The album cover is taken from the 1980 film The Killings at Outpost Zeta.

The first pressing of the CD from Warp Records was on a black CD, similar to original PlayStation discs, and included a sticker with the yellow Boards of Canada logo on it. The barcode on the CD's digipack was also an easily removable sticker.

Reception
AllMusic said of the reissue of Twoism:

"Excepting only the rigid drum monster "Basefree" (which sounds a bit like Aphex Twin circa 1992), Twoism features the same exquisitely spooky, textured emotronica that fans will want to hear, all at as high a level as the brilliant Music Has the Right to Children to boot."

Track listing

Credits 
 Michael Sandison - production, photography
 Marcus Eoin - production
 Chris Horne - production

References

External links
Twoism on Discogs

Boards of Canada albums
1995 debut EPs